Blackledge-Kearney House, also known as Cornwallis' Headquarters, is located within the Palisades Interstate Park in Alpine, Bergen County, New Jersey, United States. The original, southern portion of the house was probably built in the 1760s, and the northern addition built around 1840. It was added to the National Register of Historic Places on July 24, 1984. Lord Cornwallis was believed to have used the house as a temporary headquarters during his crossing of the Hudson River in 1776, but modern historians dispute this claim.

History
The house was built at Closter Landing in the 1760s. Maria Blackledge, the daughter of Benjamin Blackledge lived in the house with her husband Daniel Van Sciver. The house was purchased in 1817 by James and Rachel Kearney. James died in 1831 and Rachel used the house as a tavern. The house was expanded to accommodate the tavern. In 1907 the house was purchased by the Palisades Interstate Park. The house was used as a police station for the park in the 1920s.

The park now uses the house as a museum known as Kearney House.

See also
National Register of Historic Places listings in Bergen County, New Jersey

References

External links

 Kearney House – official site

Alpine, New Jersey
Historic house museums in New Jersey
Houses on the National Register of Historic Places in New Jersey
Houses completed in 1750
Houses in Bergen County, New Jersey
Museums in Bergen County, New Jersey
National Register of Historic Places in Bergen County, New Jersey
Stone houses in New Jersey
New Jersey Register of Historic Places